Gabrielle Montoya Mayo (born January 26, 1989) is an American sprinter who specializes in the 100 metres. She attended Texas A&M University.

A native of Raleigh, North Carolina, Mayo attended Southeast Raleigh Magnet High School. She won a silver and a gold medal at the 2006 World Junior Championships in Athletics.   She was Track and Field News "High School Athlete of the Year" in 2006.

Mayo was part of a US  relay squad that established the second fastest Jr time over that distance. It was the World Jr Record. at the time.

References

External links
Texas A&M Aggies bio
World Athletics profile

1989 births
Living people
Track and field athletes from Raleigh, North Carolina
American female sprinters
Texas A&M Aggies women's track and field athletes